Bona is an arrondissement of Bounkiling in Sédhiou Region in the country of Senegal.

References 

Arrondissements of Senegal